Amvey may refer to:
 Anviq
 Avan Sar